Desert Springs may refer to:

 Desert Springs, Northern Territory, Australia
 Desert Springs, Arizona, an unincorporated community that shares a post office with Beaver Dam, Arizona, US
 “Desert Springs”, an episode of the US TV show Without a Trace
 Desert Springs, Inc, owner of the former TV station KPDC-LP in Indio, California, US
 Desert Springs Cricket Ground, cricket ground in Spain

See also 
 Desert Spring (disambiguation)